Mexico was a barque that was wrecked off Southport on 9 December 1886. She was repaired only to be lost in Scottish waters in 1890.

History

Wreck

On 9 December 1886, the Mexico was on its way from Liverpool to Guayaquil, Ecuador when it was caught in a storm. Lifeboats were launched from Lytham, St. Annes and Southport to rescue the crew. The Lytham lifeboat Charles Biggs, which was on her maiden rescue, rescued the twelve crew but both the St. Annes lifeboat Laura Janet and the Southport lifeboat Eliza Fernley were capsized, and 27 of the 29 crew were drowned. To date, this is the worst loss of RNLI crew in a single incident. Mexico came ashore off Birkdale, opposite the Birkdale Palace Hotel.

Aftermath

Sixteen women were left widows, and fifty children lost their fathers. Queen Victoria and the Kaiser sent their condolences to the families of the lifeboatmen. An appeal was launched to raise money to provide a memorial to those killed, and the organisation by Sir Charles Macara of the first street collections in Manchester in 1891 led to the first flag days. The disaster has a permanent memorial in Lytham St. Annes lifeboat house. An appeal has been launched by the Lytham St. Annes Civic Society for the restoration of four of the memorials.

Memorials

Memorials to the tragedy were erected on the Promenade at St. Annes, in the lifeboat house at Lytham St. Annes, in St. Annes parish church, in St Cuthbert's Churchyard, Lytham and at Layton Cemetery. A further memorial was erected at Duke Street Cemetery, Southport.

Further history
Mexico was refloated on 11 March 1887. She was sold for £45, becoming a temporary tourist attraction at Lytham St Annes. She was eventually lost in Scottish waters in 1890.

Television
The story of the wreck of the Mexico was featured in an episode of the BBC TV programme Coast, appearing in the fifth episode of the first series, first broadcast on 3 July 2005.

See also
Southport and St Anne's lifeboats disaster
Royal National Lifeboat Institution

References

1886 in the United Kingdom
Maritime incidents in December 1886
History of Blackpool
Shipwrecks in the Irish Sea
Merchant ships of the German Empire
Maritime incidents in 1890